News to Go is a Philippine television news broadcasting show broadcast by GMA News TV. Hosted by Kara David and Howie Severino, it premiered on February 28, 2011 and worldwide on GMA News TV International. The show concluded on May 31, 2019.

Overview
Anchored by Howie Severino and Kara David, it highlighted different news and opinions from the internet.

On April 24, 2017, the newscast was moved from original timeslot (9:00 AM) to its final timeslot and reduced its running brought about by the relaunch and expansion of Dobol B sa News TV.

On May 31, 2019, the newscast aired its final episode to give way to the expansion of Dobol B sa News TV block and transfer of GMA News TV in Manila from Channel 11 to Channel 27 (DWDB-TV) on June 4, 2019.

Segments
For the Record
The Big Picture
Quick Facts
Analysis
NewsToGram
Pabaong Balita

Accolades

References

External links
 

2011 Philippine television series debuts
2019 Philippine television series endings
Filipino-language television shows
GMA Integrated News and Public Affairs shows
GMA News TV original programming
Philippine television news shows